Louise Henriette Karoline of Hesse-Darmstadt (15 February 1761 – 24 October 1829), was the first Grand Duchess of Hesse and by Rhine by marriage.

Life 
Louise was a daughter of Prince George William of Hesse-Darmstadt (1722–1782) from his marriage to Countess Maria Louise Albertine of Leiningen-Dagsburg-Falkenburg (1729–1818), daughter of Count Christian Karl Reinhard of Leiningen-Dachsburg-Falkenburg-Heidesheim.

The princess was in 1770 in the entourage of Marie Antoinette, as they traveled  to France for her marriage.  Louise exchanged letters with the French queen until 1792.

Louise married on 19 February 1777 in Darmstadt, her cousin the then hereditary prince Louis I of Hesse-Darmstadt (1753–1830).  Her husband ruled Hesse-Darmstadt from 1790 as Landgrave Louis X and from 1806 as Ludwig I, Grand Duke of Hesse and the Rhine.

Louise spent the summer months since 1783 in the State Park Fürstenlager, and died there in 1829.  Here provided charity to the population Auerbach.  The Grand Duchess was described as amiable and revered by the nation.
Johann Wolfgang von Goethe stayed at her court and Friedrich Schiller read from his Don Carlos in her salon.  It was said that Napoleon Bonaparte promised the beautiful Louise, whom he believed to be one of the cleverest women of her time, that he would give her a crown.

Luisenstraße and Luisenplatz in Darmstadt are named after Louise.

Issue 
From her marriage with Louis, Louise had the following children:
 Louis II (1777–1848), Grand Duke of Hesse and by Rhine; married in 1804 princess Wilhelmine of Baden (1788–1836)
 Luise Karoline of Hesse-Darmstadt (1779–1811); married in 1800 Prince Louis of Anhalt-Köthen (1778–1802)
 George of Hesse-Darmstadt (1780–1856); married morganatically in 1804 Caroline Török de Szendrő (1786–1862), "Baroness of Menden" 1804, "Countess of Nidda," 1808, "Princess of Nidda 1821; (divorced 1827)
 Frederick of Hesse-Darmstadt (1788–1867)
 Stillborn twin daughters (1789).
 Emil of Hesse-Darmstadt (1790–1856)
 Gustav of Hesse-Darmstadt (1791–1806)

Ancestry

References 

 Philip Alexander Ferdinand Walther:  Darmstadt, what was like and what it has become'', p. 240
 Carl Friedrich Günther:  Anecdotes, character descriptions and memoirs from the Hessian area.'', p. 172

Louise # 1761
1761 births
1829 deaths
Landgravines of Hesse-Darmstadt
Grand Duchesses of Hesse
Burials at the Mausoleum for the Grand Ducal House of Hesse, Rosenhöhe (Darmstadt)